Xiaoling may refer to the following from China:
Deng Xiaoling (邓小玲; born 1974), female softball player who competed at the 2000 and 2004 Summer Olympics
Lan Xiaoling (born 1993), Chinese team handball player
Luo Xiaoling (born 1988), Chinese professional racing cyclist
Ming Xiaoling Mausoleum (明孝陵), the tomb of the Hongwu Emperor, the founder of the Ming Dynasty, in Nanjing
Qing Xiaoling Mausoleum (清孝陵), the tomb of the Shunzhi Emperor, one of the Eastern Qing tombs near Beijing
Zhang Xiaoling (张小玲; born 1957), female Paralympic table tennis player

Chinese feminine given names